John Francis Pott (born November 6, 1935) is an American professional golfer.

Pott was born in Cape Girardeau, Missouri and reared in southern Mississippi, where he learned to play golf on the course where his father was the club professional. He played collegiately at Louisiana State University, helping the Tigers win the NCAA Championship in 1955.

Pott turned pro in 1956. He won five times on the PGA Tour in the 1960s. He was a member of three Ryder Cup teams; 1963, 1965, and 1967 although he injured his back in 1965 and did not play. His best finish in a major was T-5 at the 1961 PGA Championship.

As his tour playing days were winding down, Pott became involved in the golf course design and golf services business with fellow former Tour pros Ernie Vossler and Joe Walser, Jr.  He oversaw the Design and Construction Division of Landmark Golf and the Golf Operations Division of Landmark Golf Management.

In 2008, Langtry Farms announced its appointment of Pott as Langtry’s new Director of Golf Operations. Pott will be responsible for Langtry’s proposed private championship 18-hole golf course and clubhouse in Lake County, California.

Professional wins (5)

PGA Tour wins (5)

PGA Tour playoff record (2–5)

Results in major championships

Note: Pott never played in The Open Championship.

CUT = missed the half-way cut
WD = withdrew
"T" indicates a tie for a place

Sources:

U.S. national team appearances
Professional
Ryder Cup: 1963 (winners), 1965 (winners), 1967 (winners)

References

External links

American male golfers
LSU Tigers golfers
PGA Tour golfers
Ryder Cup competitors for the United States
Golfers from Missouri
People from Cape Girardeau, Missouri
1935 births
Living people